Euxton is a village and civil parish of the Borough of Chorley, in Lancashire, England. The population of the civil parish as taken at the 2011 census was 9,993, however, the population is now estimated to be around 14,000 due to the increase in housing developments in the village, including the Buckshaw development. The village is situated just to the west of Chorley, and to the south of Clayton-le-Woods.

Euxton is around 2.5 miles from east to west and 2 miles north to south. The village is made up of several areas including Runshaw Moor, Balshaw, Shaw Green, Daisy Hill, Buckshaw, Pincock, Primrose Hill, Glead Hill, Dawbers, Spout Hillock, Culbeck and Pear Tree.

Euxton is served by five primary schools, namely: Balshaw Lane Primary, Primrose Hill Primary, Euxton C of E Primary, Euxton RC Primary and Trinity C of E/Methodist Primary School.

History

Euxton's original village settlement in Pincock was based near the ford over the River Yarrow, along the route of the old Roman road Watling Street – now the A49 road – that runs through the length of the village, from Pincock to Packsaddle.

Demonstrating its significance, Euxton had a market charter granted in 1301 by Edward I and whilst the area was called Euxton, the township was called Euxtonburgh. The name suggests an Anglo-Saxon origin. It has been suggested that it is derived from "Efe's Tun", with "tun" referring to a farmstead and Efe being a personal name and the later addition of burgh suggesting the settlement had grown and been fortified. 

The manorial seat was Euxton Hall owned first by the Molyneux family and later by the Anderton family. A new manor house is said to have been built in the early 16th century by Hugh Anderton (1466-1516/17). It is likely that the manor would have been located closer to the parish church. A new hall was built by William Anderton (c.1708-44) in 1769 and rebuilt on the same site but on a grander scale in 1850. Euxton Hall is now a private hospital and is made up of the lower ground floor of hall as the upper floor was demolished following a fire.

Charles II lodged at Euxton Hall in 1651 when on his way south to Worcester, he is said to have drunk water from the stream at the edge of Euxton describing it as "Cul Beck" or cool brook giving it its name, from whence the area takes its name.

The hall had three lodge houses, one at the bottom of Chapel Brow, one at main gates of Euxton Park on Wigan Road and one on Dawber's Lane which is now much extended and known as Dower House. The centre of the village later moved from the old ford to be closer to Euxton Hall and its chapel (now Euxton Parish Church).

Whilst the oldest extant building is believed to be the parish church and although Euxton Hall is likely to be older in places, dating back to 1662, Armetriding Farm is believed to be the oldest dwelling house. 

One of the most significant buildings in Euxton is Buckshaw Hall, an H-plan two-storey timber framed property on a sandstone base, with both brick and wattle and daub infilling and a slate roof. It is considered to be one of the best preserved Tudor halls in Lancashire. 

 Euxton Hall Chapel was designed by  architect E. W. Pugin (1834–1875), and built in 1866 as a private chapel for the Anderton family who lived in Euxton Hall.

There has been a building at Runshaw Hall since medieval times and the current house was built in 1862 and later acquired by William Bretherton.

Early industry
Euxton Hall, which was a significant stately residence, now acts as a private hospital and is half its former glory, with the second storey being removed in the 20th century along with its grand colonnade. Euxton Hall's 19th century gatehouses can be seen at the bottom of Chapel Brow, near the parish church whilst the other gatehouse can be seen at the entrance of Euxton Hall Gardens. Earlier gatehouses were previously located on Dawbers Lane and Runshaw Lane. Balshaw Lodge, which has recently been redeveloped, was originally built as guest lodgings for the hall.

There was a large Royal Ordnance Factory (ROF Chorley) built here in the buildup to the Second World War (Nevell et al., 1999). At its peak the factory employed over 40,000 people, and had its own railway station. It was probably the biggest munitions filling factory in the world, and it is said that the bouncing bombs used in the Dambusters raid were made there. ROF Chorley later came under the ownership of British Aerospace, and in subsequent years was closed down with the land being sold. In the early 2000s the former ROF Chorley site was effectively flattened and sanitised, so that the land could be transformed into the new Buckshaw Village.

Modern industry 
Plans by Tarmac to operate a sand quarry near the village were approved in August 2008 by a planning inspector. The quarry, to be located between Runshaw Lane and Dawber's Lane, had been proposed for ten years and is opposed by the village council, and by local residents, some of whom set up an action group, Euxton Residents Against Sand Extraction (ERASE), due to its impact on health, traffic and environment locally.  The quarry has permission to operate for 15 years.

Estates and public houses

The village also has seven public houses; the Talbot, the Euxton Mills, the Railway at Euxton, the Bay Horse, the Traveller's Rest, the Plough and the War Horse (in the Buckshaw part of Euxton). 

Euxton has several large housing estates, particularly in the eastern half of the village built in the late 1960s by Trevor Hemmings. The Talbot Estate lies to the east of Euxton and the Greenside Estate to the north on Runshaw Lane. 

Newer housing estates include Wentworth Drive to the north-east of the village and Church Walk and Park Avenue to the west.

Euxton's population was significantly increased after the Royal Ordnance Factory in Buckshaw was demolished and redeveloped, creating a huge new residential and commercial area in the north of the village.

Transport 
The north-south M6 motorway lies west of the village. Access from the M6 is by Junction 28 for the A49 road at nearby Clayton-le-Woods.

Euxton has two railway stations. It's connected to Liverpool and Preston via the West Coast Main Line at Euxton Balshaw Lane railway station and to Chorley and Manchester via Buckshaw Parkway railway station.

In 1997, Euxton Balshaw Lane railway station was re-opened after a gap of some 30 years. It is on the Preston - Wigan West Coast Main Line. The nearby station, Buckshaw Parkway was opened in 2011 to serve the new Buckshaw Village development, and is on the Preston - Manchester line.

In addition Stagecoach Merseyside & South Lancashire operate the Route 109 through the village to provide a connection to Chorley, Leyland, Clayton-le-Woods and Preston. The Route 10, 11, 12 and 16 also ran through Euxton until 2012. Stagecoach also planned to extend the Route 111 to Chorley via Euxton, however these plans were abandoned after Lancashire County Council removed funding. The Route 109/A passed through the north of Euxton past Runshaw College, but was axed following a claim from Stagecoach that too few paying passengers used it.

Euxton is home to three listed railway bridges, Pincock Bridge, Old Station Bridge (Wigan Road) and Bay Horse Brow (Euxton Lane). There are also bridges on School Lane and Balshaw Lane.

Preston Bus operate the Route 347 to Southport bi-hourly on weekdays.

Sport
The former ROF Chorley sports ground was used by English football team Bolton Wanderers as its training headquarters. On 19 February 2016, the training facility was sold by Bolton Wanderers to Wigan Athletic whilst on 1 September 2020 Wigan sold it to Preston North End.

The village is also home to Euxton Corinthians F.C., Euxton Villa F.C., Euxton Girls F.C. and Euxton Cricket Club. Euxton Villa F.C. have a training ground on Runshaw Lane.

See also
Listed buildings in Euxton

Notes

References
 Nevell, M., Roberts, J. and Smith, J. (1999) A History of Royal Ordnance Factory, Chorley, Lancaster : Carnegie Publishing,

External links

Euxton on chorley.gov.uk

Geography of Chorley
Villages in Lancashire
Civil parishes in Lancashire